Jenny Colgan (born 14 September 1972, Prestwick, Ayrshire) is a Scottish writer of romantic comedy fiction and science-fiction. She has written for the Doctor Who line of stories. She writes under her own name and using the pseudonyms Jane Beaton and J. T. Colgan.

She won the Romantic Novel of the Year award in 2013 for Welcome to Rosie Hopkins' Sweetshop of Dreams and the Romantic Novelists' Association award for Comedy Novel of the Year in 2018 for The Summer Seaside Kitchen.

Biography
Jenny Colgan studied at the University of Edinburgh and worked for six years in the health service, moonlighting as a cartoonist and a stand-up comic.

She is married to Andrew Beaton, a marine engineer, and has three children. She splits her time between France and London.

In 2000, she published her first novel, the romantic comedy Amanda's Wedding. In 2004 one of her stories was included in Scottish Girls About Town. In 2013, her novel Welcome to Rosie Hopkins' Sweetshop of Dreams won the Romantic Novel of the Year Award by the Romantic Novelists' Association. In 2018 she won an edition of Celebrity Mastermind with a score of 21 points.

In July 2012, her Doctor Who tie-in novel Dark Horizons was published under the name J. T. Colgan.

Bibliography

As Jenny Colgan

Single novels 
 Amanda's Wedding (2000)
 Looking for Andrew McCarthy (2001)
 Talking to Addison (2001) aka My Very '90s Romance
 Working Wonders (2003) aka Arthur Project
 Do You Remember the First Time? (2004) aka The Boy I Loved Before
 Sixteen Again (2004)
 Where Have All the Boys Gone? (2005)
 West End Girls (2006)
 Operation Sunshine (2007)
 Diamonds Are a Girls Best Friend (2008)
 The Good, the Bad and the Dumped  (2010)
 The Loveliest Chocolate Shop in Paris (2013)
 Working Wonders (2013)
 The Christmas Bookshop (2021)

Little Beach Street Bakery
 The Little Beach Street Bakery (2014)
 Summer at Little Beach Street Bakery (2015)
 Christmas at Little Beach Street Bakery (2016)
 Sunrise by the Sea (2021)

At the Cupcake Café
 Meet Me at the Cupcake Café (2011)
 Christmas at the Cupcake Café  (2012)

Polly
 Polly and the Puffin (2015)
 The Stormy Day (2016)
 The New Friend (2017)
 The Happy Christmas (2017)

Rosie Hopkins' Sweet Shop
 Welcome to Rosie Hopkins' Sweet Shop of Dreams (2012)
 Christmas at Rosie Hopkins' Sweet Shop (2013)
 The Christmas Surprise (2014)

Scottish Bookshop
 The Bookshop on the Corner (2016) aka The Little Shop of Happy-Ever-After
 The Bookshop on the Shore (2019)
 500 Miles from You (2020)

Summer Seaside Kitchen
 A Very Distant Shore (prequel, 2017)
 The Café by the Sea (2016) published in paperback as The Summer Seaside Kitchen (2017)
 The Endless Beach (2018)
 Christmas on the Island (2018) aka An Island Christmas
 Christmas at the Island Hotel (2020)
 An Island Wedding (2022)

As Jane Beaton

Maggie, a Teacher in Turmoil
 Class: Welcome to the Little School by the Sea (2008)
 Rules: Things are Changing at the Little School by the Sea (2010)
 Lessons (3 part serialization)

As J. T. Colgan/Jenny T. Colgan

 Resistance Is Futile (2015)
 Spandex and the City (2017)

Doctor Who
 Dark Horizons (2012)
 Into the Nowhere (2014)
 In the Blood (2016)
 The Christmas Invasion (2018)
  The Triple Knife and Other Doctor Who Stories (2018)
  Star Tales (2019)

References

External links
 Jenny Colgan official site
 Simon & Schuster biography
 View from a broad (2006 Guardian article)
 

1972 births
Living people
People from Prestwick
Alumni of the University of Edinburgh
People educated at Queen Margaret Academy
Scottish women novelists
Scottish romantic fiction writers
British chick lit writers
RoNA Award winners
Women romantic fiction writers
Writers of Doctor Who novels